The Peninsula Developmental Road (PDR) runs  from Lakeland to Weipa. It is the main road transport link within Cape York Peninsula and to the rest of the Australian mainland.

The  within the Rio Tinto mine lease boundary is not part of the Queensland Department of Transport and Main Roads controlled road. The department excluded this  section from its official PDR calculations.

Road conditions

The condition of the unsealed road is highly variable. Mud, sand, dust, gravel and dirt corrugations are some of the road conditions subject to change of weather conditions.

A five-year program of sealing work joint funded by the Federal and State governments through the Cape York Region Package commenced in 2014. As of December 2015,  of new road has been sealed through the Cape York Region Package. As at June 2019, a total of  will be sealed under the package, leaving only  of  unsealed.

Upgrades
The Roads of Strategic Importance initiative, last updated in March 2022, includes the following projects for the Peninsula Developmental Road.

Corridor upgrade
A lead project to upgrade the Cooktown to Weipa corridor, including the Peninsula Developmental Road and surrounding state and council roads, at an estimated cost of $323.1 million, was commenced in 2020, with an expected completion in mid-2024.

Progressive sealing
A project for progressive sealing of sections of the Peninsula Developmental Road at a cost of $190 million is planned to be completed by mid-2024.

Cape York community access roads
A project to upgrade five roads that link Cape York communities to the Peninsula Development Road, at a cost of $47.5 million is due for completion in mid-2024.

List of towns, localities and points of interest along the highway
 Lakeland
 Laura
 Coen
 Archer River

Major intersections

See also

 List of highways in Queensland

References

Highways in Queensland
Far North Queensland